"War Is Hell (On the Homefront Too)" is a song written by Curly Putman, Bucky Jones and Dan Wilson, and recorded by American country music artist T. G. Sheppard.  It was released in July 1982 as the first single from the album Perfect Stranger.  The song was Sheppard's 11th No. 1 song on the Hot Country Singles chart in the fall of 1982. The single went to number one for one week and spent a total of thirteen weeks on the country chart.

Content
The story about a teenaged boy's sexual initiation by a married woman whose husband was stationed on the front lines in World War II. The song is sung in the first person, from the perspective of the teenage boy.

Charts

See also
 List of anti-war songs

References
 

1982 singles
1982 songs
T. G. Sheppard songs
Songs written by Curly Putman
Song recordings produced by Buddy Killen
Warner Records singles
Curb Records singles
Songs written by Bucky Jones